WTON is a sports formatted broadcast radio station licensed to Staunton, Virginia, United States, serving Staunton and Augusta County, Virginia.  WTON is owned and operated by High Impact Communications, Inc.

References

External links
ESPN Radio 1240 The Boss Online

TON
ESPN Radio stations
Sports radio stations in the United States
Radio stations established in 1946
1946 establishments in Virginia